Dynein light chain roadblock-type 1 is a protein that in humans is encoded by the DYNLRB1 gene.

This gene is a member of the roadblock dynein light chain family and encodes a cytoplasmic protein that is capable of binding intermediate chain proteins. Upregulation of this gene has been associated with hepatocellular carcinomas, suggesting that this gene may be involved in tumor progression.

References

Further reading

External links